The 51st series of University Challenge began on 12 July 2021 on BBC Two. The final aired on 4 April 2022 when Imperial College London and the University of Reading were declared the series winners and runners-up respectively.

Results
 Winning teams are highlighted in bold.
 Teams with green scores (winners) returned in the next round, while those with red scores (losers) were eliminated (as it was impossible for them to be in the highest scoring losers).
 Teams with orange scores had to win one more match to return in the next round.
 Teams with yellow scores indicate that two further matches had to be played and won (teams that lost their first quarter-final match).
 A score in italics indicates a match decided on a tie-breaker question.

First round

Highest scoring losers play-offs

Second round

Quarterfinals

Semifinals

Final

 The trophy and title were awarded to the Imperial team comprising Max Zeng, Fatima Sheriff, Michael Mays and Gilbert Jackson.
 The trophy was presented by Russian-born Dutch-British physicist Andre Geim.
 In what was the most closely fought university challenge final since 2006 (when the University of Manchester beat Trinity Hall, Cambridge also by ten points), Imperial had leads of 90 to 25 and 105 to 45 before Reading fought back to take a narrow 120 to 105 lead. Max Zeng (Imperial) then narrowly beat the Reading captain Michael Hutchinson to a starter, after which Imperial took two bonuses and a five point lead in the process. A five point penalty for Reading was the final change in the scoreline before the gong.

Spin-off: Christmas Special 2021

First round
Each year, a Christmas special sequence is aired featuring distinguished alumni. Out of 7 first-round winners, the top 4 highest-scoring teams progress to the semi-finals. The teams consist of celebrities who represent their alma maters.
Winning teams are highlighted in bold.
Teams with green scores (winners) returned in the next round, while those with red scores (losers) were eliminated.
Teams with grey scores won their match but did not achieve a high enough score to proceed to the next round.
A score in italics indicates a match decided on a tie-breaker question.

Standings for the winners

Semi-finals

Final

The winning University of Edinburgh team consisted of Catherine Slessor, Thomasina Miers, Miles Jupp and Phil Swanson. The second placed Hertford College team consisted of Soweto Kinch, Elizabeth Norton, Adam Fleming and Isabelle Westbury.

References

External links
University Challenge homepage
Blanchflower Results Table

2021
2021 British television seasons
2022 British television seasons